I colpevoli (also known as The Guilty) is a 1957 Italian-French drama film directed by Turi Vasile. It is based on the comedy play Sulle strade di notte by Renato Lelli.

Plot 
Valerio Rossello is a judge, with a rigid and uncompromising mentality. He is married to Lucia, a woman who instead follows the model of a loving and protective mother. From their union only one child was born: Maurizio. Both parents raise him completely differently, highlighting their character differences. Until the day when Maurizio, now a teenager, together with a friend commits an attack for futile reasons against a gas station attendant. Having learned of the incident, Valerio and Lucia also in this case intend to face the situation in a diametrically opposite way. The conflicts within the family thus strongly resurface, in which, amidst rebounds of responsibility, the errors of both parents emerge in the upbringing of their child. The decision in the end, however painful, will be shared by all.

Cast 
 Isa Miranda: Lucia Rossello
 Carlo Ninchi: Valerio Rossello
 Vittorio De Sica:	Giorgio
 Etchika Choureau:	Sandra
 Helene Partello: Susanna 
 Wandisa Guida (as Vandisa Guida)

References

External links

1957 films
Italian drama films
1957 drama films
1950s Italian films